Haunted Mansion is an upcoming American supernatural horror comedy film directed by Justin Simien from a screenplay by Katie Dippold. The film stars Rosario Dawson, Chase W. Dillon, LaKeith Stanfield, Owen Wilson, Tiffany Haddish, Winona Ryder, Dan Levy, Hasan Minhaj, Danny DeVito, Jared Leto, and Jamie Lee Curtis. Produced by Walt Disney Pictures and Rideback, it is the second theatrical film adaptation of Walt Disney's theme park attraction The Haunted Mansion, following the 2003 film of the same name. In the film, Gabbie (Dawson) and Travis (Dillon) enlists the aid of a team to help exorcise the mansion and destroy the ghosts around them.

Plans for the reboot adaptation based on The Haunted Mansion began in July 2010, when Guillermo del Toro, who intended to write and produce, stated the project would take place in a heightened reality rather than in a real-world setting. del Toro was no longer attached as the project's director in July 2013. After spending years in development hell, Disney officially announced Haunted Mansion in August 2020, with Dippold signed on to write a new screenplay for the film. Simien negotiated to direct the film by April 2021, and was officially confirmed three months later. The primary cast was confirmed from July to October, while additional cast was announced the following year. Principal photography began from mid-October 2021 to late February 2022.

Haunted Mansion is scheduled to be released in the United States on July 28, 2023, by Walt Disney Studios Motion Pictures.

Premise 
Single mom Gabbie and her 9-year-old son, who are looking to start a new life, move into a strangely affordable mansion in New Orleans, only to discover that the place is much more than they bargained for. Desperate for help, they contact a priest, who, in turn, enlists the aid of a team which consists of a widowed scientist-turned-failed-paranormal expert, a French Quarter psychic, and a crotchety historian to help exorcise the mansion and destroy the ghosts around them in order to stop them from being able to escape and kill them.

Cast 

 LaKeith Stanfield as Ben Matthias, a paranormal expert
 Tiffany Haddish as Harriet, a psychic
 Owen Wilson as Kent, a priest
 Danny DeVito as Bruce, a college history professor
 Rosario Dawson as Gabbie, a single mother
 Chase W. Dillon as Travis, Gabbie's son
 Dan Levy
 Jamie Lee Curtis as Madame Leota
 Jared Leto as Alistair Crump / Hatbox Ghost

Additionally, Hasan Minhaj and Winona Ryder have been cast in undisclosed roles.

Production

Development 
In July 2010, it was announced that a reboot adaptation based on The Haunted Mansion was in development  for Walt Disney Pictures, with Guillermo del Toro as writer and producer. Del Toro stated the project would not take place in a real-world setting, but in a heightened reality. He revealed that the Hatbox Ghost would be one of the main characters, and said the film would be "scary and fun at the same time, but the scary will be scary." In June 2011, Walt Disney World Imagineer Jason Surrell was brought onto the project as a creative consultant. In August 2012, del Toro submitted the final draft of his script to Walt Disney Studios, intended for a PG-13 rating. By July 2013, del Toro announced he was no longer the project's director, but remained as co-writer and executive producer. In April 2015, Ryan Gosling was in early negotiations to star, while D.V. DeVincentis was hired to rewrite the script. In September 2016, Brigham Taylor was hired as producer.

In August 2020, it was announced that Katie Dippold signed on to write a new screenplay for the film, after it was decided that del Toro's script was too scary for family audiences. Dan Lin and Jonathan Eirich were hired as producers. The project will be a joint-venture production between Walt Disney Pictures and Rideback. By April 2021, Justin Simien entered early-negotiations to direct the film, and was officially confirmed as director by July 2021.

Casting 
Tiffany Haddish, LaKeith Stanfield, Owen Wilson, Rosario Dawson, and Danny DeVito were each cast to appear in the film. In July 2022, Jamie Lee Curtis and Jared Leto were revealed to have been cast. During the 2022 D23 Expo presentation, it was revealed that Winona Ryder, Dan Levy, and Hasan Minhaj were cast.

Filming 
Principal photography ran from mid-October 2021 to late February 2022 in New Orleans, Louisiana and Atlanta, Georgia. On January 14, 2022, Haddish got into legal trouble after being arrested on a DUI charge as filming for the movie was still taking place in Georgia.

Visual effects 
The visual effects will be handled by DNEG. and Industrial Light & Magic

Marketing 

On April 28, 2022, during the 2022 CinemaCon event, the film's logo was unveiled. Writing, for Collider, Hilary Remley noted its font's similarities to a not-so-inviting fence. A sizzle reel of the film was also shown at the 2022 D23 Expo.

On March 1, 2023, the teaser poster was unveiled, with the teaser trailer announced to premiere the next day. Britta DeVore of Collider said it looked to be "keeping in line with the fan-favorite ride", citing the portrait corridor. Alongside the trailer, a second poster was released on March 2, 2023.

Release 
The film is scheduled for release on July 28, 2023. It was previously scheduled for March 10, 2023, and then August 11, 2023.

References

External links 
 
 

2020s American films
2020s English-language films
2023 horror films
2023 films
American comedy horror films
American ghost films
American haunted house films
American supernatural horror films
Films based on amusement park attractions
Films produced by Dan Lin
Films scored by Kris Bowers
Films set in country houses
Films shot in Atlanta
Films shot in New Orleans
Films with screenplays by Katie Dippold
Fictional places in Disney films
Haunted Mansion
Upcoming English-language films
Upcoming films
Walt Disney Pictures films